Miguel Tsao or Tsao Li-jey is a Taiwanese diplomat and politician.

Education
Tsao obtained his bachelor's degree in Spanish Literature and master's degree in European Studies from Tamkang University.

Careers
He was the Vice Minister of Foreign Affairs in 2018–2021. On 25 June 2021, he was appointed to be the representative to Argentina.

References

Living people
Ambassadors of the Republic of China to Panama
Representatives of Taiwan to Peru
Government ministers of Taiwan
Year of birth missing (living people)